

England

Head Coach: Geoff Cooke

 Rob Andrew
 Neil Back
 Stuart Barnes
 Martin Bayfield
 Kyran Bracken
 Jonathan Callard
 Will Carling (c.)
 Mike Catt
 Ben Clarke
 Graham Dawe
 Phil de Glanville
 Jon Hall
 Ian Hunter
 Martin Johnson
 Jason Leonard
 Brian Moore
 Dewi Morris
 Steve Ojomoh
 David Pears
 Nigel Redman
 Dean Richards
 Tim Rodber
 Graham Rowntree
 Dean Ryan
 Victor Ubogu
 Rory Underwood
 Tony Underwood

France

Head Coach: Pierre Berbizier

 Guy Accoceberry
 Louis Armary
 Abdelatif Benazzi
 Philippe Benetton
 Laurent Benezech
 Philippe Bernat-Salles
 Xavier Blond
 Olivier Brouzet
 Laurent Cabannes
 Marc Cecillon
 Yann Delaigue
 Philippe Gallart
 Fabien Galthié
 Jean-Michel Gonzales
 Stéphane Graou
 Thierry Lacroix
 Fabrice Landreau
 Leon Loppy
 Alain Macabiau
 Olivier Merle
 Franck Mesnel
 Pierre Montlaur
 Émile Ntamack
 Alain Penaud
 Olivier Roumat (c.)
 Jean-Luc Sadourny
 Philippe Saint-André (c.)*
 Laurent Seigne
 Philippe Sella
 William Téchoueyres

*captain in the last game

Ireland

Head Coach: Gerry Murphy

 Michael Bradley (c.)
 Ciaran Clarke
 Peter Clohessy
 Vince Cunningham
 Phil Danaher
 Eric Elwood
 Maurice Field
 Neil Francis
 Mick Galwey
 Simon Geoghegan
 Garret Halpin
 Paddy Johns
 Terry Kingston
 Alan McGowan
 Denis McBride
 Mark McCall
 Paul McCarthy
 Ken O'Connell
 Conor O'Shea
 Nick Popplewell
 Brian Robinson
 Rob Saunders
 David Tweed
 Richard Wallace
 Keith Wood

Scotland

Head Coach: Jim Telfer

 Gary Armstrong
 Paul Burnell
 Craig Chalmers
 Michael Dods
 Neil Edwards
 Gavin Hastings (c.)
 Scott Hastings
 Carl Hogg
 Ian Jardine
 Kenny Logan
 Kevin McKenzie
 Kenny Milne
 Iain Morrison
 Shade Munro
 Andy Nicol
 Bryan Redpath
 Andy Reed
 Allan Sharp
 Ian Smith
 Tony Stanger
 Derek Stark
 Gregor Townsend
 Derek Turnbull
 Rob Wainwright
 Peter Walton
 Alan Watt
 Doddie Weir
 Peter Wright
 Douglas Wyllie

Wales

Head Coach: Alan Davies

 Tony Clement
 Tony Copsey
 John D. Davies
 Nigel Davies
 Phil Davies
 Ieuan Evans (c.)
 Ricky Evans
 Michael Hall
 Simon Hill
 Garin Jenkins
 Neil Jenkins
 Robert Jones
 Emyr Lewis
 Gareth Llewellyn (c.)*
 Robin McBryde
 Rupert Moon
 Mark Perego
 Wayne Proctor
 Scott Quinnell
 Mike Rayer
 Hemi Taylor
 Nigel Walker
 Barry Williams
 Huw Williams-Jones

*captain in the third game

External links

Six Nations Championship squads